Gressly is a surname. Notable people with the surname include:

Amanz Gressly (1814–1865), Swiss geologist and paleontologist
David Gressly (born 1956), American humanitarian